Federal Triangle is an Washington Metro station in Washington, D.C., United States. The island-platformed station was opened on July 1, 1977, and is operated by the Washington Metropolitan Area Transit Authority (WMATA). Providing service for the Blue, Orange, and Silver Lines, the station's entrance is beneath the William Jefferson Clinton Federal Building.

History
The station opened on July 1, 1977. Orange Line service to the station began upon the line's opening on November 20, 1978. Silver Line service at Federal Triangle began on July 26, 2014.

On January 13, 1982, an eastbound Metro train on the Orange Line derailed just east of the station resulting in three fatalities, the first fatalities in the system's history.

From March 26, 2020 until June 28, 2020, this station was closed due to the 2020 coronavirus pandemic.

Between January 15 to January 21, 2021, this station was closed because of security concerns due to the 2021 Inauguration.

Location 
The station serves an area of Washington crowded with federal buildings, on 12th Street between Pennsylvania Avenue NW and Constitution Avenue NW, including the triangular area formed by 15th Street, Constitution, and Pennsylvania known as Federal Triangle, from which the station takes its name. The triangle includes such federal buildings as the Robert F. Kennedy Department of Justice Building, the Herbert C. Hoover Building (Department of Commerce), and the buildings of the Internal Revenue Service and the Environmental Protection Agency.

Station layout 
Federal Triangle utilizes the simple island platform layout. There are two tracks: track D1 is used for trains bound for New Carrollton and Downtown Largo, and track D2 is used for trains going to Vienna, Ashburn and Franconia–Springfield. As with all stations on the Metro, there are platform edge lights to warn passengers of incoming trains. In 2008, WMATA installed red-colored LED lights at Federal Triangle and centrally-located stations after a successful pilot at Gallery Place-Chinatown. There is a coffered barrel-vault ceiling at Federal Triangle, as is typical of other Washington Metro stations built at that time.

There is only one entrance to the platform level, located slightly south of the center of the platform. Escalators from this mezzanine level lead to the plaza of the William Jefferson Clinton Federal Building. A flat square on the ceiling of the station denotes a possible second entrance to the station; this has yet to be used. Similar walls can be found at stations such as Archives–Navy Memorial–Penn Quarter.

In popular culture 
The station was featured in the 2007 film Breach.

Notable places nearby 

 Several federal government buildings in and near the Federal Triangle
 William Jefferson Clinton Federal Building (United States Environmental Protection Agency headquarters
 Andrew W. Mellon Auditorium
 Robert F. Kennedy Department of Justice Building (Department of Justice headquarters)
 Herbert C. Hoover Building (Department of Commerce headquarters)
 National Aquarium in Washington, D.C.
 White House Visitor Center
 Environmental Protection Agency
 J. Edgar Hoover Building (Federal Bureau of Investigation headquarters)
 Old Post Office (Waldorf=Astoria Hotel)
 Ronald Reagan Building and International Trade Center
 Freedom Plaza
 National World War I Memorial
 National Mall
 Several Smithsonian Institution museums on the Mall, including the National Museum of American History and National Museum of Natural History

References

External links 

 The Schumin Web Transit Center: Federal Triangle Station
 12th Street entrance from Google Maps Street View

Stations on the Blue Line (Washington Metro)
Federal Triangle
Stations on the Orange Line (Washington Metro)
Stations on the Silver Line (Washington Metro)
Washington Metro stations in Washington, D.C.
Railway stations in the United States opened in 1977
1977 establishments in Washington, D.C.
Railway stations located underground in Washington, D.C.